CNOOC Limited is China's largest producer of offshore crude oil and natural gas, noted as such in 2010. It is a major subsidiary of China National Offshore Oil Corporation (CNOOC) and has been listed in Hong Kong  since February 2001. It was listed on the New York Stock Exchange from 2001 to 2021. It was on the Toronto Stock Exchange between 2013 (following its acquisition of Nexen Inc) and 2021. It was admitted as a constituent stock of the Hang Seng Index in July 2001.

History
China National Offshore Oil Corporation or CNOOC, is a state-owned enterprise based in Beijing, capital of China. In order to float most of its assets in Hong Kong stock exchange, a special purpose vehicle was incorporated in Hong Kong as an intermediate holding company, in order to transfer the control of some subsidiaries to the company. Thus, it was considered as a red chip company of the exchange, due to its government background but incorporated outside mainland China.

Operations
Its core domestic operation areas are in Bohai, the South China Sea, and the East China Sea. Internationally, it has oil and gas assets in Asia, Africa, North America, South America, and Oceania.

As of December 31, 2011, the CNOOC Limited owned net proven reserves of approximately 3.19 billion barrel of oil equivalent (BOE), and its average daily net production was 909,000 BOE.

Competition in China
CNOOC Ltd's parent, China National Offshore Oil Corporation (CNOOC), is the third largest of the "Big Three" Chinese oil companies, and traditionally specialised in offshore upstream exploration and production, whereas CNPC Group specialised in onshore upstream exploration and production, and Sinopec Group specialised in refining and marketing. These distinctions are now increasingly blurred as the three companies compete in all areas. All of the "Big Three" have vested the majority of revenue producing assets in listed Hong Kong subsidiaries. CNPC into PetroChina, Sinopec Group into Sinopec Limited, and CNOOC Group into CNOOC Limited.

Through COOEC and other state owned entities, CNOOC owns and operates a number of offshore vessels, including six large crane barges, namely "HYSY 202", "HYSY201", "Lanjing", "Blue Xinjiang", "Binhai 109", "HYSY286", "HYSY289" and "HYSY291".

See also

 China National Offshore Oil Corporation (CNOOC)
 Petroleum industry in China

References

Further reading 

  Note: link presented is to page D1; see also page D5 link.

External links
 
 
 Wikinvest CNOOC Ltd. 

Companies listed on the Hong Kong Stock Exchange
Companies formerly listed on the New York Stock Exchange
Companies formerly listed on the Toronto Stock Exchange
China National Offshore Oil Corporation